Sören Ludolph (born 25 February 1988, in Lüneburg) is a German middle-distance runner. At the 2012 Summer Olympics, he competed in the 800 metres, finishing seventh in his first round heat.

References

External links 

 

1988 births
Living people
People from Lüneburg
Sportspeople from Lower Saxony
LG Braunschweig athletes
German male middle-distance runners
German national athletics champions
Olympic athletes of Germany
Athletes (track and field) at the 2012 Summer Olympics